John Pius Leahy, O.P. (b. Cork 25 July 1802; d. Newry 6 September 1890) was an Irish Catholic Priest who served as Bishop of Dromore from 1860 to 1890.

Aged 15, Leahy sailed from Cork for Lisbon. He was received into the Dominican Order on 8 September 1817; professed on 9 September 1818; and priested on 6 August 1826.
He spent 30 years in Lisbon, rising to be Professor of Philosophy, Theology and Ecclesiastical History. Returning to his native Cork where he served as prior in St. Mary's Dominican Church and Priory. Leahy was appointed Coadjutor Bishop of Dromore on 7 July 1854; and consecrated on 1 October 1854. He succeeded as Diocesan Bishop of Dromore on 27 February 1860; and served until his death. 

Bishop Leahy invited his order the Dominicans [Order of Preachers] to Newry in 1871 where they built the magnificent St Catherine’s Church.

References

1802 births
1890 deaths
19th-century Roman Catholic bishops in Ireland
Clergy from Cork (city)
Irish Dominicans
Dominican bishops
Roman Catholic bishops of Dromore